is a train station in Sangō, Ikoma District, Nara Prefecture, Japan.

Lines 
Kintetsu
Ikoma Line

Layout

Surroundings
 Sangō Town Office
 Tatsuta Shrine
 Mount Shigi Chōgosonshiji Temple
 Nara Sangyo University Shigisan Ground

Adjacent stations 

Railway stations in Japan opened in 1922
Railway stations in Nara Prefecture